The 2022–23 Cal Poly Mustangs men's basketball team represented California Polytechnic State University in the 2022–23 NCAA Division I men's basketball season. The Mustangs, led by fourth-year head coach John Smith, played their home games at the Robert A. Mott Athletics Center in San Luis Obispo, California as members of the Big West Conference.

Previous season
The Mustangs finished the 2021–22 season 7–21, 2–12 in Big West play to finish in a tie for last place. They were defeated by UC Davis in the first round of the Big West tournament.

Roster

Schedule and results

|-
!colspan=12 style=| Exhibition

|-
!colspan=12 style=| Non-conference regular season

|-
!colspan=12 style=| Big West regular season

|-
!colspan=12 style=| Big West tournament

Sources

References

Cal Poly Mustangs men's basketball seasons
Cal Poly Mustangs
Cal Poly Mustangs men's basketball
Cal Poly Mustangs men's basketball